Kristin "Kris" Kuehl (born July 30, 1970, in Windom, Minnesota) is a retired track and field athlete from the United States, who competed in the discus throw event. Kuehl attended Division III Concordia College in Moorhead, Minnesota. Kuehl was the 2002 USA champion, and won the silver medal at the 1999 Pan American Games in Winnipeg, Manitoba, Canada, after gaining the bronze four years earlier in Mar del Plata. Her personal best throw is 65.34 metres (214.37 feet), achieved in April 2000 in St Paul.

International competitions

External links
 Kris Kuehl at USA Track & Field
 
 
 

1970 births
Living people
People from Windom, Minnesota
Track and field athletes from Minnesota
American female discus throwers
Olympic track and field athletes of the United States
Athletes (track and field) at the 2000 Summer Olympics
Pan American Games medalists in athletics (track and field)
Athletes (track and field) at the 1995 Pan American Games
Athletes (track and field) at the 1999 Pan American Games
World Athletics Championships athletes for the United States
Pan American Games silver medalists for the United States
Pan American Games bronze medalists for the United States
Goodwill Games medalists in athletics
Competitors at the 1998 Goodwill Games
Medalists at the 1995 Pan American Games
Medalists at the 1999 Pan American Games
21st-century American women